The 1962 Tour de France was the 49th edition of the Tour de France, one of cycling's Grand Tours. After more than 30 years, the Tour was again contested by trade teams. Frenchman Jacques Anquetil defended his title, winning his third Tour de France.

Classification standings

Stage 11
4 July 1962 — Bayonne to Pau,

Stage 12
5 July 1962 — Pau to Saint-Gaudens,

Stage 13
6 July 1962 — Luchon to Superbagnères,  (ITT)

Stage 14
7 July 1962 — Luchon to Carcassonne,

Stage 15
8 July 1962 — Carcassonne to Montpellier,

Stage 16
9 July 1962 — Montpellier to Aix-en-Provence,

Stage 17
10 July 1962 — Aix-en-Provence to Antibes,

Stage 18
11 July 1962 — Antibes to Briançon,

Stage 19
12 July 1962 — Briançon to Aix-les-Bains,

Stage 20
13 July 1962 — Bourgoin to Lyon,  (ITT)

Stage 21
14 July 1962 — Lyon to Nevers,

Stage 22
15 July 1962 — Nevers to Paris,

Notes

References

External links

1962 Tour de France
Tour de France stages